James Thomas Callahan (October 4, 1930 – August 3, 2007) was an American film and television actor who appeared in more than 120 films and television programs between 1959 and 2007. He is perhaps best known for his portrayal from 1987 to 1990 of Walter Powell on the syndicated sitcom Charles in Charge, starring Scott Baio.

Early years
One of three children, Callahan was born in Grand Rapids, Michigan, to William and Elenora Callahan on October 4, 1930. After his service in the United States Army from 1951 to 1953, he worked for the United States Postal Service. While attending school in the Midwest, he discovered acting and on the advice of a teacher, he enrolled at the University of Washington in Seattle He studied drama and graduated in the late 1950s.

Career
Callahan played a doomed soldier/journalist in the M*A*S*H episode "Sometimes You Hear the Bullet". He also had recurring roles in three 1960s series, as Danny Adams in ABC's Wendy and Me, with a cast including George Burns, Connie Stevens, Ron Harper, and J. Pat O'Malley, as Lieutenant O'Connell on NBC's 13-episode war drama, Convoy, with John Gavin and John Larch, and as the governor's press secretary in The Governor and J.J., which starred Dan Dailey and Julie Sommars. Callahan portrayed a small role in Barnaby Jones in an episode titled "Counterfall" (02/04/1975).

Personal life 
Callahan did not marry until he was sixty-three, when he wed Peggy Cannon in 1994. They were married until his death in 2007.

Death
In February 2007, Callahan was diagnosed with esophageal cancer. Six months later, on August 3, 2007, Callahan died at his home in Fallbrook, California at age 76.

Filmography

References

External links

1930 births
2007 deaths
20th-century American male actors
American male film actors
American male television actors
Deaths from cancer in California
Deaths from esophageal cancer
Male actors from Grand Rapids, Michigan
People from Fallbrook, California